The Billboard Argentina Hot 100 is a chart that ranks the best-performing songs in the Argentina. Its data, published by Billboard Argentina magazine and compiled by Nielsen SoundScan and BMAT/Vericast, is based collectively on each song's weekly physical and digital sales, as well as the amount of airplay received on Argentine radio stations and TV and streaming on online digital music outlets.

Chart history

See also
 List of Billboard Argentina Hot 100 top-ten singles in 2019
 List of Billboard Argentina Hot 100 number-one singles of 2018
 List of Billboard Argentina Hot 100 number-one singles of 2020

References

2019
Argentina Hot 100